Cíntia "Tuiú" Silva dos Santos (born 31 January 1975 in Mauá) is a Brazilian former basketball player. In over a decade with the national team, she competed in three Olympics - 1996, 2000, and 2004 - winning two medals, and three World Championships, winning it all in 1994.

WNBA career statistics

Regular season

|-
| style="text-align:left;"|2000
| style="text-align:left;"|Orlando
| 32 || 31 || 25.6 || .423 || .000 || .702 || 3.9 || 1.2 || 0.5 || 2.0 || 1.7 || 7.1
|-
| style="text-align:left;"|2001
| style="text-align:left;"|Orlando
| 10 || 0 || 6.5 ||| .368 || .000 || .833 || 0.6 || 0.2 || 0.3 || 0.5 || 0.7 || 1.9
|-
| style="text-align:left;"|2002
| style="text-align:left;"|Orlando
| 26 || 0 || 10.0 || .491 || .000 || .783 || 1.3 || 0.4 || 0.2 || 0.5 || 0.8 || 3.4
|-
| style="text-align:left;"|Career
| style="text-align:left;"|3 years, 1 teams
| 68 || 31 || 16.8 || .432 || .000 || .743 || 2.4 || 0.7 || 0.3 || 1.2 || 1.2 || 4.9

Playoffs

|-
| style="text-align:left;"|2000
| style="text-align:left;"|Orlando
| 3 || 3 || 27.3 || .500 || .000 || 1.000 || 2.7 || 1.0 || 0.7 || 2.3 || 1.7 || 6.0

References

1975 births
Living people
People from Mauá
Brazilian expatriate basketball people in the United States
Brazilian women's basketball players
Olympic basketball players of Brazil
Basketball players at the 1996 Summer Olympics
Basketball players at the 1999 Pan American Games
Basketball players at the 2000 Summer Olympics
Basketball players at the 2004 Summer Olympics
Olympic silver medalists for Brazil
Olympic bronze medalists for Brazil
Olympic medalists in basketball
Pan American Games competitors for Brazil
Medalists at the 2000 Summer Olympics
Medalists at the 1996 Summer Olympics
Sportspeople from São Paulo (state)